Korschenbroich is a town in the Rhein-Kreis Neuss, in North Rhine-Westphalia, Germany. It is situated on the river Niers, approx. 13 km west of Neuss and 5 km east of Mönchengladbach.

Twin towns – sister cities

Korschenbroich is twinned with:
 Carbonne, France

Gallery

References

Towns in North Rhine-Westphalia
Rhein-Kreis Neuss